Craig Aaron Novitsky (born May 12, 1971) is an American former professional football player who was a guard for the New Orleans Saints in the National Football League (NFL). He played college football with the UCLA Bruins. As a senior, Novitsky was an all-conference player in the Pacific-10 (now known as the Pac-12). He was drafted by New Orleans in the fifth round of the 1994 NFL draft, and played three seasons with the Saints.

Early life
Novitsky was born in Washington, D.C., and grew up in Woodbridge, Virginia. As a youngster, people would make fun of where he was from, his name, and his height. He attended Potomac High School in Prince William County, Virginia, where he was an all-state offensive lineman.

College career
Novitsky chose to play college ball with UCLA over USC, Duke, Penn State and Rutgers. He set a Bruins record with 46 straight starts, while also becoming the first player in school history to start every game of a four-year career.

He was a redshirt in his first year. After four seniors graduated, he became a starter the following season, when he earned second-team Freshman All-American honors. He was an All-Pac-10 selection as a senior in 1993. Normally a left guard, he also played at center and left tackle that season. Due to injuries to teammates, he started at three different positions over three straight weeks.

Professional career
The New Orleans Saints selected Novitsky in the fifth round of the 1994 NFL draft with the 143rd overall pick. He played three seasons with the Saints, appearing in 41 games with 10 starts.

After his playing career, he became a financial services manager with a Lexus car dealer in Alexandria, Virginia.

References

External links
 

1971 births
Living people
American football offensive guards
New Orleans Saints players
People from Woodbridge, Virginia
Players of American football from Virginia
UCLA Bruins football players